The yellow-lored tody-flycatcher or grey-headed tody-flycatcher (Todirostrum poliocephalum) is a species of bird in the family Tyrannidae.  It is endemic to Brazil, occurring from Southern Bahia southwards to Santa Catarina. Measures an average of 8.8 centimeters and weighs an average of 6.8 grams.

It is an insectivorous bird, feeding on small arthropods.

Its natural habitats are subtropical or tropical moist lowland forest and heavily degraded former forest, including urban parks and gardens. Spends most of the time amongst foliage and is hard to be observed due to its diminutive size. Makes, however, a conspicuous round nest with straw and leaves, hanging from branches at a small height from the ground and with a side entrance. Lays from two to three eggs each nesting season, which are incubated solely by the female.

References

Birds of the Atlantic Forest
Todirostrum
Endemic birds of Brazil
Birds described in 1831
Taxonomy articles created by Polbot